"Gorilla Warfare" is the third episode of the seventh season of the British comedy series Dad's Army. It was originally transmitted on Friday 29 November 1974.

Synopsis
Mainwaring casts himself as a highly important secret agent whom his platoon must escort to a clandestine destination. GHQ has put out counter-agents to catch him, so the platoon decides to trust no-one. Hodges arrives with news of "an 'orrible hairy monster on the loose".

Plot
The platoon arrives at the church hall and load their equipment onto Jones' van, ready for a weekend exercise. The exercise concerns guerrilla warfare, the objective of the exercise is to transport a highly important agent (Mainwaring) to a selected destination while avoiding the best efforts of the mock enemy to capture him. The importance of the exercise does not stop Godfrey and Wilson bringing a few luxury items, to the consternation of Mainwaring.

Mainwaring briefs the men on the exercise and takes the opportunity to ridicule Captain Square and the Eastgate platoon, after their attempt at the exercise the previous week resulted in Square being captured after only an hour. Unbeknownst to Mainwaring, the Verger and Warden Hodges are watching them, discussing their plans to sabotage the platoon's efforts on the orders of Captain Square, who has offered them £1 each to foil Mainwaring.

The platoon embarks on the exercise with various adventures, making surprisingly good progress and managing to avoid the schemes of Hodges and the Verger, who, while walking through some woodland, are suddenly pursued by what appears to be a gorilla. Meanwhile, a man in a white coat approaches Mainwaring with a story about a missing gorilla, trained by the War Office for war work. Sensing a ploy, the platoon dismisses this information, even when Hodges, having taken refuge in a tree, tells them of the animal he has encountered.

While the platoon spends the night in an outlying barn, the gorilla hides in the straw unnoticed, and later disappears. The gorilla returns to GHQ, where it is revealed to be an officer in disguise, spying on the platoon. Meanwhile, Frazer tells the men the "Story of the Auld Empty Barn" ("There was nothing in it!"). The following morning Mainwaring and his men attempt the final leg of the exercise, to transport Mainwaring to the special destination. Pressed for time, Mainwaring and Jones commandeer Hodges' motorbike, with the rest of the platoon following in the van.

Hodges returns, having called the RSPCA and summoned their help. They have provided him with a large hypodermic, though Mainwaring still brushes aside any suggestion of a gorilla, until it suddenly appears brandishing a revolver. A panicking Jones sticks the hypodermic in Mainwaring by mistake, causing him to lose control and veer off the road, and Jones manages to get hold of the pistol. As the rest of the platoon and the Colonel arrive, the gorilla implores him not to shoot, revealing himself as an army officer. The Colonel congratulates them on winning the exercise, while a slumped Mainwaring passes out.

Cast

Arthur Lowe as Captain Mainwaring
John Le Mesurier as Sergeant Wilson
Clive Dunn as Lance Corporal Jones
John Laurie as Private Frazer
Arnold Ridley as Private Godfrey
Ian Lavender as Private Pike
Bill Pertwee as ARP Warden Hodges
Edward Sinclair as The Verger
Talfryn Thomas as Private Cheeseman
Robert Raglan as The Colonel
Robin Parkinson as Lieutenant Wood
Erik Chitty as Mr. Clerk
Rachel Thomas as The Mother Superior
Michael Sharvell-Martin as The Lieutenant
Verne Morgan as The Farmer
Joy Allen as The Lady with the pram

Dad's Army (series 7) episodes
1974 British television episodes